New York's 85th State Assembly district is one of the 150 districts in the New York State Assembly. It has been represented by Democrat Kenny Burgos since 2020.

Geography
District 85 is in The Bronx. It covers the South Bronx neighborhoods of Soundview, Clason Point, Longwood, and Hunts Point.

Recent election results

2022

2020

2018

2016

2014

2012

2010

2009 special

References

85